Lyster Hoxie Dewey (1865–1944)  was an American botanist from Michigan.

Lyster Dewey was born in Cambridge, Michigan on March 14, 1865.  In 1888, he graduated from Michigan State Agricultural College where, for the next two years, he taught botany.

Career
Dewey was hired as an assistant botanist of the United States Department of Agriculture in 1890. He served in that role until 1903 when he became the botanist in charge of fiber investigations and fiber plants research at USDA's Arlington Experimental Farm.

In 1911, he was the U.S. representative to the International Fibre Congress, held in Surabaya on Java island, in the Dutch East Indies (present day Indonesia).

Publications
His publications comprised bulletins of the United States Department of Agriculture, on:
 the production of fiber from flax, hemp (Cannabis species), sisal, and manila plants
 the origin of cotton and classification of the varieties of cotton plants (Gossypium species).
 investigations on grasses and invasive troublesome weeds.

He wrote about growing exotically named varieties of hemp on USDA research land in Virginia known as the Arlington Experimental Farm, site of the present day Pentagon.

Personal Diaries 
Dewey began keeping personal diaries in 1896 and wrote in them nearly daily until his death in 1944. He recorded everything from quotidian activities such as where he dined that day, who he met at the office, how his wife and family spent their afternoons; he recorded important current events, such as presidential inaugurations, developments in the many wars that occurred during his lifetime, notes on the weather, modes of transportation and his personal reflections. Dewey recorded in his diaries much of the field observation and study he conducted on industrial hemp”numerous crops of diverse varieties which he grew on U.S. Department of Agriculture (USDA) research plots just outside Washington, D.C. where he lived with his family.

Taxonomist abbreviation

References

External links
 
 
 Lyster Dewey diaries web site

American agricultural writers
American botanical writers
American pamphleteers
American male non-fiction writers
American taxonomists
1865 births
1944 deaths
Cannabis researchers
Scientists from Michigan
United States Department of Agriculture people
Michigan State University alumni
Michigan State University faculty
People from Lenawee County, Michigan
19th-century American botanists
20th-century American botanists
20th-century American non-fiction writers